Jean Gagnon (born October 22, 1970 in Gagnon, Quebec) is a Canadian curler from Saint-Étienne, Quebec.

Teams

Men's

Mixed

Personal life
Jean Gagnon works as head of Technical Services, CDRI Lévis.

References

External links
 
 Jean Gagnon – Curling Canada Stats Archive

Living people
1970 births
People from Côte-Nord
People from Lévis, Quebec
Canadian male curlers
Curlers from Quebec
Brier champions